Gülfem Hatun ("rose mouth" was a lady-in-waiting to Suleiman the Magnificent (reign 1520–1566).

Life
Throughout Suleiman the Magnificent's reign (reign 1520–1566), she enjoyed a considerable status within the imperial harem. She received 150 aspers a day, but historians are divided on what her role was: according to some, she was a high-ranking lady in the administration of the harem, according to others she was one of the consort of Süleyman and mother of Şehzade Murad (and/or Raziye Sultan), and who, after death of her son, she became a lady-in-waiting and hostess of the harem by virtue of her qualities and closeness to the sultan, instead of being exiled to the province as tradition. 

In September 1542, she commissioned a soup kitchen in Üsküdar. In March 1543 she established the financial ground work to built a "timber frame mosque" now known as the "Gülfem Hatun Mosque", located near the soup kitchen. According to a local tradition, the mosque was intended for the use of women and opened to men only in recent times. A school is also present near the mosque.

She died in 1561–62, and was buried in her own mosque.

In popular culture
In the 2003 Turkish TV miniseries, Hürrem Sultan, Gülfem Hatun was played by Turkish actress Yasemin Kozanoğlu.
In the 2011–2014 Turkish historical fiction TV series Muhteşem Yüzyıl, Gülfem was portrayed by Turkish actress Selen Özturk.

References

Sources
 
 
 
 
 
 
 

Suleiman the Magnificent
1560s deaths
Concubines of the Ottoman Empire